The Prime Minister of Aruba is de facto head of the Executive branch of government. Together with Aruba's Council of Ministers, they form the executive branch of Aruban government.

List of prime ministers of Aruba

Government of Aruba